The Cognitive Rules is the 2011 EP by British singer-songwriter RJ Thompson. It was released on 4 December 2011 and serves as the follow-up to his 2007 Acoustic Sessions EP. The EP was recorded at Trinity Heights in Newcastle upon Tyne, and mastered by Geoff Pesche at Abbey Road Studios.

Singles
RJ released two singles in the year, 2011 (A Better Life and When I Get Old), and both tracks were released on the EP The Cognitive Rules later that same year. The single A Better Life received airplay on BBC Radio 2, while opening track Fables was featured on BBC Radio 6 Music

Track listing

References

2011 EPs